The Chikara Campeonatos de Parejas (Chikara Tag Team championship) was a professional wrestling tag team championship contested for in the Philadelphia, Pennsylvania based promotion Chikara.

History
The Campeonatos de Parejas was introduced in February 2006. The creation of the title was the foundation of that year's Tag World Grand Prix tag team tournament, scheduled to be the final TWGP for the promotion. The title was to be awarded to the winning team of the tournament. The eventual winners were the team of Chris Hero and Claudio Castagnoli, The Kings of Wrestling, who defeated Milano Collection A.T. and Skayde (Team DragonDoor) in the finals of the tournament to be crowned the first Campeones de Parejas.

The Kings of Wrestling (Chris Hero and Claudio Castagnoli) were the first champion in the title's history, having won the title on February 26, 2006. Pieces of Hate (Jigsaw and The Shard) holds the record for the longest reign in the title's history, at 413 days. The Rumblebees (Solo Darling and Travis Huckabee) hold the record for the shortest reign, at less than one day. 3.0 (Scott Parker and Shane Matthews), Los Ice Creams (El Hijo del Ice Cream and Ice Cream Jr.) and F.I.S.T. (Chuck Taylor and Johnny Gargano) share the record for most reigns as a team with two, while Parker, Matthews, El Hijo del Ice Cream, Ice Cream Jr., Taylor, Gargano, Claudio Castagnoli and Jigsaw share the record for most reigns individually, also with two. Overall, there have been 25 reigns shared among 42 different wrestlers and 23 teams.

Earning a title shot

This title, when compared to other titles, is unorthodox due to the nature of how a team earns a title shot. A team becomes eligible to challenge for the Campeonatos de Parejas as soon as they earn three points. Teams rack up points by winning tag team matches. As soon as they get the three points, they can challenge the reigning Campeones for the title. However, if they lose a match, the team loses all of their points and must start again. Essentially, when a duo wins three tag team matches in a row, they are eligible to have a title shot. As of You Only Live Twice, all previous points accumulated by teams have been reset and removed entirely. Per Lucha Libre tradition, title defenses are Campeones vs. Retadores in Two out of Three Falls match.

Reigns

Combined reigns

By team

By wrestler

{| class="wikitable sortable" style="text-align: center"
!Rank
!Wrestler
!No. ofreigns
!Combineddefenses
!Combineddays
|-
!|
|
|rowspan=2|
|
|
|-
!|
|
|
|
|-
!|
|
|rowspan=18|
|
|
|-
!rowspan=2|
|
|rowspan=2|
|rowspan=2|
|-
|
|-
!rowspan=2|
|
|rowspan=2|
|rowspan=2|
|-
|
|-
!rowspan=2|
|Amasis
|rowspan=2|
|rowspan=2|
|-
|

|-
!rowspan=2|
|
|rowspan=2|
|rowspan=2|
|-
|
|-
!rowspan=2|
|
|rowspan=2|
|rowspan=2|
|-
|
|-
!rowspan=2|
|
|rowspan=2|
|rowspan=2|
|-
|
|-
!|
|
|
|
|-
!|
|
|
|
|-
!|
|
|
|
|-
!rowspan=2|
|
|rowspan=2|
|rowspan=2|
|-
|
|-
!rowspan=2|
|
|rowspan=6|
|rowspan=2|
|rowspan=2|
|-
|
|-
!rowspan=2|
|
|rowspan=2|
|rowspan=2|
|-
|
|-
!rowspan=2|
|Solo Darling
|rowspan=2|
|rowspan=2|
|-
|Willow Nightingale 
|-
!rowspan=2|
|
|rowspan=2|
|rowspan=2|
|rowspan=2|–
|-
|-
|
|-
!rowspan=2|
|
|rowspan=2|
|rowspan=2|
|rowspan=2|
|-
|
|-
!rowspan=2|
|Fire Ant
|rowspan=2|
|rowspan=2|
|rowspan=2|
|-
|Soldier Ant
|-
!rowspan=2|
|Scott Parker
|rowspan=2|
|rowspan=2|
|rowspan=2|
|-
|Shane Matthews
|-
!rowspan=2|
|
|rowspan=8|
|rowspan=2|
|rowspan=2|
|-
|
|-
!rowspan=2|
|
|rowspan=2|
|rowspan=2|
|-
|
|-
!rowspan=2|
|
|rowspan=2|
|rowspan=2|
|-
|
|-
!rowspan="2" |
|
|rowspan=2|
|rowspan=2|
|-
|
|-

See also
Chikara Grand Championship
Chikara Young Lions Cup

References

External links
 CHIKARA Campeonatos de Parejas Championship

Chikara (professional wrestling) championships
Tag team wrestling championships